Đồng Xoài is the capital city of Bình Phước Province in the Southeast region of Vietnam. The city was the site of the 1965 Battle of Đồng Xoài during the Vietnam War. As of 2009, the district had a population of 88,380, and a total area of 168 km². The district capital lies at Đồng Xoài.

Administrative division
Bình Long consists of 6 wards (phường) and 2 communes (xã):
 Wards: Tân Bình, Tân Đồng, Tân Phú, Tân Thiện, Tân Xuân, Tiến Thành
 Communes: Tân Thành, Tiến Hưng.

References

Provincial capitals in Vietnam
Populated places in Bình Phước province
Districts of Bình Phước province
Cities in Vietnam